O'Kane Market and O'Kane Building are historic commercial buildings located at Rochester in Monroe County, New York. The O'Kane Market (1878) and O'Kane Building (1889–1890) are architecturally significant as intact, representative examples of late 19th century Italianate and Eclectic style commercial properties in Rochester's Eighth Ward.

It was listed on the National Register of Historic Places in 1985.

References

Commercial buildings on the National Register of Historic Places in New York (state)
National Register of Historic Places in Rochester, New York